20th Century Masters – The Millennium Collection: The Best of Atlanta Rhythm Section is a greatest hits album by the band Atlanta Rhythm Section released through Universal Music Group. The collection spans the band's history from 1974 through 1981.

Track listing 

All original recordings (24-bit mastered)

Personnel
Barry Bailey – lead guitar
Buddy Buie – backing vocals
J.R. Cobb – rhythm guitar, backing vocals
Dean Daughtry – keyboards
Paul Goddard – bass guitar
Ronnie Hammond – lead vocals, backing vocals
Robert Nix – percussion, drums, backing vocals

References

Atlanta Rhythm Section compilation albums
2000 greatest hits albums
Atlanta Rhythm Section
Albums produced by Buddy Buie
Universal Music Group compilation albums
A&M Records compilation albums